Wilhelm Anton von Klewitz or Klewiz (1 August 1760, Magdeburg – 26 July 1838, Magdeburg) was a Prussian politician and civil servant notable for his part in the Prussian reforms.

References
:de:s:ADB:Klewitz, Wilhelm von

1760 births
1838 deaths
Prussian politicians
Finance ministers of Prussia
Provincial Presidents of Saxony